The 2001–02 Argentine Primera B Nacional was the 16th season of second division professional of football in Argentina. A total of 25 teams competed; the champion and runner-up were promoted to Argentine Primera División.

Club information

Torneo Apertura Standings

Torneo Clausura Standings
It was divided in 3 Zones with 8 teams in each zone. Olimpo did not compete as it was promoted to Primera División.

Zone A

Zone B

Zone C

Overall standings

Second Promotion Playoff
The Second Promotion Playoff or Torneo Reducido was played by the teams who won their respective zones in the Torneo Clausura: Arsenal (winner of Zone A), Gimnasia y Esgrima (CdU) (winner of Zone B) and Godoy Cruz (winner of Zone C) and the five best teams placed in the overall standings: Huracán (TA) (3rd), Quilmes (4th), Atlético de Rafaela (5th), El Porvenir (6th) and Instituto (7th). The winner was promoted to Primera División.

Bracket

Note: The team in the first line plays at home the second leg.

Promotion Playoff Primera División-Primera B Nacional
The best two teams in the overall standings that weren't promoted (Huracán (TA) and Gimnasia y Esgrima (CdU)) played against the 18th and the 17th placed of the Relegation Table of 2001–02 Primera División.

|-
!colspan="5"|Relegation/promotion playoff 1

|-
!colspan="5"|Relegation/promotion playoff 2

|-
|}

Lanus remains in Primera División after winning the playoff.
Unión remains in Primera División after winning the playoff.

Relegation
7 teams were relegated: 2 teams with the worst co-efficient from Interior Zone, 2 teams with the worst co-efficient from Metropolitana Zone and 3 more teams regardless their affiliation.

Note: Clubs with indirect affiliation with AFA are relegated to the Torneo Argentino A, while clubs directly affiliated face relegation to Primera B Metropolitana. Clubs with direct affiliation are all from Greater Buenos Aires, with the exception of Newell's, Rosario Central, Central Córdoba and Argentino de Rosario, all from Rosario, and Unión and Colón from Santa Fe.

See also
2001–02 in Argentine football

References

External links

Primera B Nacional seasons
2001–02 in Argentine football leagues